Ang Cute ng Ina Mo! is a 2007 Filipino comedy Drama film directed by Wenn V. Deramas. It stars Ai-Ai delas Alas, Anne Curtis, Eugene Domingo, Luis Manzano and John Lapus. The film premiered on April 7, 2007. This is the second film co-produced by Viva Films and Star Cinema years after Viva split from ABS-CBN in 2001.

Plot
In 1986, Georgia Quizon, her Australian fiancé Jack Outback and their daughter Christine are about to board a plane to Australia when she needs to use the comfort room. Because of the long wait time, Jack and Christine are forced to leave for Australia without her. She tries to get a Visa to reunite with her family, until in 1989, when she was about to leave, she was not able to board the plane as her passport was shot. Because of what happened, Jack breaks up with Georgia. Georgia then works at a fish sauce factory owned by Don Emong Goloid, and they marry. On the night of their honeymoon, Georgia accidentally hits Don Emong with a door and fell down the stairs, from where he hanged to death. Don Emong's wealth is inherited by Georgia, which she uses to go to Australia to find her daughter. However, she fails to reunite with her daughter. She instead adopts a young boy named Val, who she treated as her child.

20 years later, Christine grew up in Melbourne, Australia as a beautiful young lady. When she found out that her father Jack is still in love with Georgia, she decided to go to the Philippines with her nanny to meet Georgia and to prevent Jack from marrying her. Georgia along with Val and Junjun decided to throw a welcome party for Christine. Before they could go to the airport, Georgia gets held hostage, but gets saved after seeing Christine. Nanny, however, has a crush on Junjun, despite the latter's homosexuality. According to her plan, Christine gathers evidence that will make Jack hate Georgia more. First, she suspects Val and Georgia to be lovers. As time goes by, Christine learns to know her mother better and falls in love with Val, but Georgia's neighbor and suitor Delfin, whose love Georgia rejected, told Christine about what happened to Don Emong. This leads Jack to come to the Philippines. Val later takes Christine's video camera and sees Christine's plot. When Christine finds out that Georgia and Emong are not married, she and Nanny hurriedly rush to the airport. Jack, however, has already arrived and shows Georgia Christine's video showing all of the evidences against her. This makes Georgia betray her own daughter. Christine then confesses to Jack that she was the one responsible for everything. There, they ask for forgiveness to Georgia, but she rejects it. When Jack, Christine and Nanny are about to return to Australia, Georgia, Val and Junjun hurriedly rush to the airport. But she once again suffers an accident, and was told that Christine has not yet boarded the plane. Despite being injured, Georgia gets married to Jack.

Cast

Main
Ai-Ai delas Alas as Georgia Quizon vda de Goloid - Outback
Anne Curtis as Christine Outback
Eugene Domingo as Nanny Ninonu
John Lapus as Junjun
Luis Manzano as Val Quizon

Supporting
DJ Durano as Delfin
Rycharde Everley as Jack Outback
Benjamin Alves as Jojo
Nikki Bacolod as Lisa
Lou Veloso as Don Emong Goloid
Makisig Morales as Super Inggo
Jojit Lorenzo as Hostage Taker
Shamaine Buencamino as Imelda Marcos
Pen Medina as Ferdinand Marcos
Moises Miclat as Gringo Honasan

Awards and recognitions
24th PMPC Star Awards for Movies
 Movie Actress of the Year - Ai-Ai delas Alas

External links

2007 films
2007 comedy-drama films
2000s Tagalog-language films
Filipino-language films
Films directed by Wenn V. Deramas
Films set in Australia
Philippine comedy-drama films
Star Cinema films
Viva Films films